Apothecaries Hall may mean:

Apothecaries Hall, London, the home of the Worshipful Society of Apothecaries in Blackfriars, London
Apothecaries' Hall of Ireland, an association of apothecaries in Ireland
Apothecaries Hall (Prince Edward Island), a National Historic Site of Canada in Charlottetown

Architectural disambiguation pages